"Git Up, Git Out" is the third and final single from Outkast's debut album Southernplayalisticadillacmuzik. A conscious Southern story-rap about the dangers of giving in to circumstances and not doing anything with one's life, the song features Cee-Lo and Big Gipp of Goodie Mob, the second appearance of any of Goodie Mob's members, after "Call Of Da Wild". Produced by the Dungeon Family's own Organized Noize, the track is also featured in the 2006 film ATL, which also featured Big Boi, and was sampled in the 1998 hit "Can I Get A..." by Jay-Z feat. Ja Rule and Amil, during Amil's verse, and in Macy Gray's 1999 debut single "Do Something".

Track listing
CD Single
 "Git Up, Git Out" – 7:27
 "Git Up, Git Out" (Outkast Mix) – 4:10
 "Git Up, Git Out" (Goodie Mob Mix) – 4:05
 "Git Up, Git Out" (Full Mix) – 7:39
 "Git Up, Git Out" (Instrumental) – 7:36

12" Vinyl Single
 "Git Up, Git Out" – 7:27
 "Git Up, Git Out" (Full Mix) – 7:39
 "Git Up, Git Out" (Goodie Mob Mix) – 4:05
 "Git Up, Git Out" (Outkast Mix) – 4:10
 "Git Up, Git Out" (Instrumental) – 7:36

Charts

References

1993 songs
1994 singles
Outkast songs
LaFace Records singles
Songs written by CeeLo Green
Songs written by Big Boi
Songs written by André 3000